Marion Posch  (born 2 November 1972) is an Italian snowboarder. 

She was born in Vipiteno. She placed sixth in women's giant slalom at the 1998 Winter Olympics. She competed at the 2002 Winter Olympics, in women's parallel giant slalom, and she competed at the 2006 Winter Olympics, in parallel giant slalom.

She won a gold medal in parallel slalom at the FIS Snowboarding World Championships 1996, and a gold medal in parallel slalom at the FIS Snowboarding World Championships 1999.

References

External links 
 

1972 births
Living people
Sportspeople from Sterzing
Italian female snowboarders
Olympic snowboarders of Italy
Snowboarders at the 1998 Winter Olympics
Snowboarders at the 2002 Winter Olympics
Snowboarders at the 2006 Winter Olympics
20th-century Italian women